White House Diary is a 2010 book by President Jimmy Carter. It is the personally-annotated diary of Carter's presidency, and contains feedback on his relationships with allies and enemies, as well as commentary on his observed impact on issues that still preoccupy America and the world.

References

External links 
 

Books by Jimmy Carter
2010 non-fiction books
Political science books
Books written by presidents of the United States